Augustus J. Ricks (February 10, 1843 – December 22, 1906) was a United States district judge of the United States District Court for the Northern District of Ohio.

Education and career

Born in Brookfield, Ohio, Ricks attended Kenyon College and read law to enter the bar in 1866. He was a Captain in the United States Army during the American Civil War from 1862 to 1865, serving with the 104th Ohio Infantry. He read law in the office of John Baxter. He was in private practice in Knoxville, Tennessee, where he had served during the war, from 1866 to 1870, as a partner of Baxter. He was an editor of the Knoxville Daily Chronicle from 1870 to 1875. He was in private practice in Massillon, Ohio from 1875 to 1878. He was a clerk of the United States Circuit Court for the Northern District of Ohio from 1878 to 1886. He was a Standing Master in Chancery for the United States District Court for the Northern District of Ohio from 1878 to 1889, and was a clerk of the United States District Court for the Northern District of Ohio from 1886 to 1889.

Federal judicial service

Ricks received a recess appointment from President Benjamin Harrison on July 1, 1889, to a seat on the United States District Court for the Northern District of Ohio vacated by Judge Martin Welker. He was nominated to the same position by President Harrison on December 16, 1889. He was confirmed by the United States Senate on January 16, 1890, and received his commission the same day. His service terminated on December 22, 1906, due to his death in New York City, New York.

References

Sources
 

1843 births
1906 deaths
Judges of the United States District Court for the Northern District of Ohio
United States federal judges appointed by Benjamin Harrison
19th-century American judges
Kenyon College alumni
United States Army officers
United States federal judges admitted to the practice of law by reading law